TitleMax, Inc. is an American privately owned title lending business with corporate offices in Dallas, Texas and Savannah, Georgia. The company has more than 1,100 stores in sixteen states. TitleMax serves individuals who generally have limited access to consumer credit from banks, thrift institutions, credit card lenders, and other traditional sources of consumer credit. TitleMax offers  title loan and title pawn products which allows customers to meet their liquidity needs by borrowing against the value of their vehicles while retaining use of their vehicle during the term of the loan.

History 
On September 1, 1998, TitleMax opened the first location in Columbus, Georgia. In October 1998, TitleMax opened its second location in Savannah, Georgia. Many Savannah locations were then established, and later that year, TitleMax opened the first out-of-state store in Phenix City, Alabama. Over the next ten years, the company continued expanding, eventually growing to over 500 locations by the end of 2007, and  surpassing $200,000,000 in account receivables. In 2008, TitleMax expanded into Virginia. In April 2009, TitleMax Holdings, LLC, filed for chapter 11 bankruptcy. According to TitleMax’s lawyer at the time, the cause of the default was attributed to “the maturity of an estimated $165 million loan from Merrill Lynch & Co.” In 2008, Bank of America acquired Merrill Lynch. The attorney of DLA Piper LLP in New York City was quoted in an interview conducted by Bloomberg as saying, “It’s a solvent company, there’s a significant amount of equity over the debt.” In April 2010, nearly one year after the bankruptcy filing, TitleMax Holdings LLC won court approval for reorganization and was able to exit bankruptcy status. Since reorganization, TitleMax continued expanding into other states. 

On August 12, 2016, a judge in Nevada ordered over 6,000 TitleMax contracts to be voided.

In November 2019, the company announced the closure of all California locations by May 2020.

Sister companies 
TitleMax’s parent company, TMX Finance, changed its name from TitleMax Holdings, LLC to TMX Finance LLC as of June 21, 2010. TMX Finance controls over 900 stores and employs over 3,000 people nationwide. TitleBucks and InstaLoan are the sister companies to TitleMax.

Criticisms 
TitleMax has received criticism for predatory lending. 

TitleMax was subject to a fine of $9 Million by the Consumer Financial Protection Bureau for unlawful debt collection practices and for luring consumers into expensive renewals of their existing loans. A Nevada Court Judge ordered TMX Finance to void over 6,000 loans due to these unlawful practices. In 2019, TitleMax was subject to a fine of $25,000 and a $700,000 refund to more than 21,000 customers to resolve allegations of excessive interest and fee charges.

References 

Companies based in Savannah, Georgia
American companies established in 1998
1998 establishments in Georgia (U.S. state)